Kalateh-ye Mirza Rajab (Romanized: Kalāteh-ye Mīrzā Rajab) is a village in Quchan Atiq Rural District, in the Central District of Quchan County, Razavi Khorasan Province, Iran. According to the 2006 census, its population was 439, in a total of 105 families.

References 

Populated places in Quchan County